The Czech Mixed Curling Championship is the national championship of mixed curling (two men and two women) in the Czech Republic. It has been held annually since the 1993–1994 season and organised by the Czech Curling Association.

List of champions and medallists
Team line-ups in order: fourth, third, second, lead, alternate, coach; skips marked in bold.

References

See also
Czech Men's Curling Championship
Czech Women's Curling Championship
Czech Mixed Doubles Curling Championship
Czech Junior Curling Championships